The play-offs of the UEFA Women's Euro 2022 qualifying competition involved the six runners-up with the worst records among all nine groups in the qualifying group stage.

The play-offs were played in home-and-away two-legged format. Originally, the three play-off winners qualified for the final tournament. One of those winners, Russia, were banned later.

Ranking of second-placed teams

To determine the three best second-placed teams from the qualifying group stage which qualified directly for the final tournament and the six remaining second-placed teams which advanced to the play-offs, only the results of the second-placed teams against the first, third, fourth, and fifth-placed teams in their group were taken into account, while results against the sixth-placed team are not included. As a result, eight matches played by each second-placed team were counted for the purposes of determining the ranking.

Draw

The draw for the play-offs was held on 5 March 2021 (originally 25 September 2020, but had been postponed due to the COVID-19 pandemic), 12:00 CET (UTC+1), at the UEFA headquarters in Nyon, Switzerland. The six teams were drawn into three ties without any seeding, with the first team drawn in each tie to be the home team of the first leg. Based on political restrictions, Russia and Ukraine could not be drawn against each other.

Summary

The first legs were played on 9 April, and the second legs were held on 13 April 2021. Originally, the three play-off winners qualified for the final tournament.

|}
Notes

Matches
Times are CEST (UTC+2), as listed by UEFA (local times, if different, are in parentheses).

Northern Ireland won 4–1 on aggregate and qualified for UEFA Women's Euro 2022.

Russia won 1–0 on aggregate, but were banned from UEFA Women's Euro 2022 due to their country's invasion of Ukraine. Portugal qualified instead.

2–2 on aggregate. Switzerland won 3–2 on penalties and qualified for UEFA Women's Euro 2022.

Goalscorers

References

External links
Fixtures & Results, UEFA.com

Play-offs
April 2021 sports events in Europe
Association football events postponed due to the COVID-19 pandemic